Eva Maria Noblezada (born March 18, 1996) is an American actress and singer.

Noblezada made her Broadway debut as Kim in a revival of Miss Saigon, a performance for which she received a nomination for a 2017 Tony Award for Best Actress in a Leading Role in a Musical, becoming one of the youngest nominees in the category, at age 21.  She played the role of Ayla in the musical Vanara in a London workshop presentation on May 11th, 2018. She originated the lead role of Eurydice in Hadestown on Broadway, a performance for which she received her second nomination for a 2019 Tony Award for Best Actress in a Leading Role in a Musical, as well as winning the 2020 Grammy Award for Best Musical Theater Album. Noblezada also played the title character of Rose in the 2020 film Yellow Rose, starring alongside Lea Salonga, who originated the role of Kim in Miss Saigon.

Early life 
Eva Maria Noblezada was born on March 18, 1996, in San Diego, California. Her father, Jon, has Filipino ancestry while her mother, Angie, is of Mexican descent. Noblezada's paternal grandparents are from Maguindanao and Iloilo. She and her family moved to Charlotte, North Carolina, where she attended the Northwest School of the Arts until she was 17. Her aunt is Annette Calud, who played Celina on Sesame Street and Kim in Miss Saigon on Broadway.

Acting career 
On July 1, 2013, Noblezada became one of five finalists for the 2013 National High School Musical Theatre Awards Her performance of the song "With You" from Ghost during the awards ceremony at the Minskoff Theatre in New York City was noted by casting director Tara Rubin, who arranged an audition for Noblezada, then 17, before producer Cameron Mackintosh for the forthcoming West End revival of Miss Saigon. Noblezada was cast in the lead role of Kim.

In the spring of 2014, Noblezada left the Northwest School of the Arts in Charlotte to star in Miss Saigon in London. For her performance as Kim, Noblezada won the 2015 WhatsOnStage Award for Best Actress in a Leading Role in a Musical. She performed "I'd Give My Life for You" at the 2015 Laurence Olivier Awards ceremony.

Following the limited run of Miss Saigon in London, Noblezada assumed the role of Éponine in the West End production of Les Misérables in April 2016.

On May 2, 2016, Noblezada made her Carnegie Hall debut, celebrating Alain Boublil and Claude-Michel Schönberg, performing "The Movie in My Mind" with Lea Salonga and The New York Pops.

Noblezada reprised her performance as Kim in the first Broadway revival of Miss Saigon, which opened at the Broadway Theatre on March 23, 2017, for a limited run through January 14, 2018. For her performance, Noblezada was nominated for the 2017 Tony Award for Best Actress in a Leading Role in a Musical.

In November 2018, Noblezada opened in the lead role of Eurydice in the Royal National Theatre's production of the musical Hadestown. She continued in the role of Eurydice when the production transferred to Broadway's Walter Kerr Theatre in April 2019. She received her second Tony Award nomination for her role and won the Broadway.com Audience Choice Award for Favorite Leading Actress in a Musical.

Noblezada made her film debut in the Diane Paragas film Yellow Rose (2019) as the title character, Rose. She starred alongside Lea Salonga, who originated the role of Kim in Miss Saigon. The film was released by Sony Pictures Stage 6 on October 9, 2020. In 2022, she starred in the film Easter Sunday, featuring an all-Filipino cast. In 2022, Blogtalk with MJ Racadio named er one of the "75 Most Influential Filipino-Americans".

Noblezada is represented by United Talent Agency.

Personal life
On November 4, 2017, Noblezada married her longtime boyfriend, actor Leo Roberts. They were together until early 2019, when they separated. Later that year, she confirmed her relationship with her Hadestown costar, Reeve Carney, whom she is currently dating.  
 
Noblezada has been vocal about her personal struggles with anxiety, depression, bulimia, and body dysmorphic disorder.

Acting credits

Film

Television

Theatre

Accolades

See also
Hadestown

References

External links
 
 

1996 births
21st-century American actresses
American actresses of Filipino descent
American actresses of Mexican descent
American musical theatre actresses
Grammy Award winners
Living people
People from San Diego
Theatre World Award winners